Mister World 2019 was the tenth edition of the Mister World competition. It was held on 23 August 2019 at the Smart Araneta Coliseum in Quezon City, Metro Manila, Philippines. Rohit Khandelwal of India crowned Jack Heslewood of England as his successor at the end of the event.

Results

Placements

Order of Announcements

Continental Zone Winners

Special Awards

Challenge Events 

 Extreme is a test of strength, endurance, and determination
 Sports is a test of skill, discipline, and athleticism
 Talent & Creativity focuses on the contestants' performing arts presentation, technique, and dedication
 Fashion looks at the contestants' runway skills, style and bearing, and overall fashion sense
 Multimedia looks at contestants' interaction with the online audience mainly on different social media platforms

Fast Track Events

Sports

Extreme Challenge

Talent & Creativity

Top Model Challenge

Multimedia Challenge

Contestants
72 contestants competed for the title.

Notes

Debuts

Returns
Last competed in 1996:
 

Last competed in 2007:
 

Last competed in 2010:

 
 
 
 
 
 

Last competed in 2012:

 
 
 
 

Last competed in 2014:

Withdrawals
  – Christian Daniel Terán Anzaldo withdrew from the competition for undisclosed reasons.
  – No delegate was appointed due to a lack of funding and sponsorship.
  – No delegate was appointed due to lack of funding and sponsorship.
  – No delegate was appointed after Mister Deutschland lost its franchise.
  – No delegate was appointed due to a lack of funding and sponsorship.
  – No delegate was appointed due to lack of funding and sponsorship.
  – Ian Alan Scott Adie withdrew from the competition for undisclosed reasons.
  – Johannes Leonidas Ulmefors suffered a high fever a few days before flying to Manila and thereby withdrew from the competition.
  – No delegate was appointed after Mister Suisse Francophone lost its franchise.
  – The Mister World Vietnam Organization originally revealed they would be sending Trần Công Hậu to the competition, but the representation did not push through for undisclosed reasons.
  – Luke Williams withdrew from the competition for undisclosed reasons.

Replacements

Crossovers
Manhunt International
 
Mister International
2011:  – Edvīns Ločmelis
2015:  – Jakub Krauś (Top 5)
2016:  – Daniel Torres Moreno (Top 9)
 
Mister Universal Ambassador
2016:  – Alejandro Martínez (Top 5)
 
Mister Globe
 2021:  – Adilbek Nurakayev

Mister Model International
2018:  – Marco D'Elia (1st runner-up)
 
Mister Gay World

References

External links
 

Mister World
2019 beauty pageants